Lurganare is a small village and townland in County Down, Northern Ireland, four miles north of Newry. It had a population of 195 at the 2001 Census. It lies within the Newry and Mourne District Council area.

References

See also
List of villages in Northern Ireland

Villages in County Down
Townlands of County Down
Civil parish of Donaghmore, County Down